Rainbow Falls Reservoir is a man-made lake located east of South Colton, New York, as part of the Raquette River. It is within the town of Parishville, New York, though the hamlet of South Colton is the closest community accessible by car via Raquette River Road. Fish species present in the reservoir are smallmouth bass, northern pike, yellow perch, black bullhead, rock bass, and walleye. There is a boat launch located on Raquette River Road.

References 

Lakes of St. Lawrence County, New York
Reservoirs in New York (state)